Leap Church is a small Gothic Revival Anglican church located in Leap, County Cork, Ireland. It was completed between 1810 and 1828. It is part of Ross Union of Parishes in the Diocese of Cork, Cloyne, and Ross.

History 
Leap church was completed in either 1810, 1827, or 1828. It was built with a loan from the Board of First Fruits. The chancel was added later in the 19th century.

It is part of the Ross Union of Parishes, the rector of which is Christopher Peters.

Architecture 
The building was designed by James Pain. An example of a typical First Fruits church, the building features a simple nave and a square tower.

References

Notes

Sources 

 

Architecture in Ireland
Churches in the Diocese of Cork, Cloyne and Ross
19th-century Church of Ireland church buildings
Gothic Revival church buildings in the Republic of Ireland
19th-century churches in the Republic of Ireland